In Greek mythology, Aegypius (Ancient Greek: Αἰγυπιός) was a Thessalian son of Antheus (son of Nomion) and Bulis. He was the lover of Timandra, a widow.

Mythology 
Timandre's son, Neophron, resented this relationship, and plotted against it by seducing Bulis (Βοῦλ-ις, -ιδος). Neophron took Bulis to his house, having arranged for his mother to be out, and excused himself just when he knew Aegypius was accustomed to come visit Timandre; thus arranging for mother and son to sleep together, each believing the other someone else. Afterwards, Aegypius fell asleep, and Bulis recognized him. She grabbed a sword, and was just about to blind Aegypius and kill herself, when Aegypius woke up. Apollo restored Aegypius's vision long enough for him to realize what had happened and changed all four of them into birds. The men became vultures, Timandra a sparrow-hawk, and Bulis a long-beaked bird that pecks out the eyes of fish. Grasping the situation, including Neophron's trick, he prayed to the gods to abolish all four of them.

Note

References
Antoninus Liberalis, The Metamorphoses of Antoninus Liberalis translated by Francis Celoria (Routledge 1992). . Online version at the Topos Text Project.

Thessalian characters in Greek mythology
Thessalian mythology
Deeds of Zeus
Deeds of Apollo
Incest in Greek mythology
Metamorphoses into birds in Greek mythology